Harmanda is a genus of harvestmen in the family Sclerosomatidae from Asia.

Species
 Harmanda aenescens (Roewer, 1911)
 Harmanda albipunctata (Roewer, 1915)
 Harmanda annulata (Roewer, 1911)
 Harmanda arunensis J. Martens, 1987
 Harmanda beroni J. Martens, 1987
 Harmanda corrugata J. Martens, 1987
 Harmanda elegantulus (Roewer, 1955)
 Harmanda instructa Roewer, 1910
 Harmanda khumbua J. Martens, 1987
 Harmanda latephippiata J. Martens, 1987
 Harmanda lineata (Roewer, 1911)
 Harmanda medioimmicans J. Martens, 1987
 Harmanda nigrolineata J. Martens, 1987
 Harmanda trimaculata Suzuki, 1977
 Harmanda triseriata Roewer, 1923

References

Harvestmen
Harvestman genera